Gummi is a LaTeX editor. It is a GTK+ application which runs on Linux systems.

Features 
Gummi has many useful features needed to edit LaTeX source code, such as: 
Live preview: The pdf is shown without the need to compile it manually
Snippets: LaTeX snippets can be configured
Graphical insertion of tables and images
Templates and wizards for new document creation
Project management
Bibliography management
SyncTeX integration

However, it lacks some features available in other editors:
Compare (available in WinEdt, Vim-LaTeX (LaTeX-suite), TeXmacs...).
Graphical insertion of mathematical symbols (available in Gnome LaTeX, TeXnicCenter, Kile, ...).
Document structure summary (available in Gnome LaTeX, Kile, ...).

Installation 
Gummi is available in the official repositories of various Linux distributions, such as Arch Linux, Debian, Fedora, Gentoo,  and Ubuntu.

See also

 List of text editors
 Comparison of text editors
 Comparison of TeX editors

References

External links

 

TeX SourceForge projects
Free TeX editors
Linux TeX software
TeX editors that use GTK
TeX editors